is a song by Japanese rock band, Asian Kung-Fu Generation. It was released as a single on March 31, 2010. The song was written for the film of the same name. The music was composed by band member Masafumi Gotoh, while the lyrics was written by Inio Asano, creator of the manga of the same name that the film is based on. Asian Kung-Fu Generation's recording was not used in the film. Instead, a cover, credited to Rotti, a fictional band from the film, with vocals by Aoi Miyazaki, who plays Meiko in the film, was used.

The single's B-side, "Mustang (mix for Meiko)" is a remix of "Mustang" from the band's 2008 EP Mada Minu Ashita ni. The song, which was also inspired by the manga, was used as the ending theme of the film. "Solanin" was included as an "extra track" on their sixth studio album, Magic Disk, and "Mustang (mix for Meiko)" is included in the band's compilation album Feedback File 2.

Music video 
The music video for "Solanin" was directed by Takahiro Miki, who also directed the film. The video features the band members walking around a city and playing a gig. Gotoh plays a Fender Mustang, the same guitar played by the main character of the film.

Track listing

Personnel
Masafumi Gotoh – lead vocals, rhythm guitar
Kensuke Kita – lead guitar, background vocals
Takahiro Yamada –  bass, background vocals
Kiyoshi Ijichi – drums
Asian Kung-Fu Generation – production

Charts

Release history

References 

Asian Kung-Fu Generation songs
2010 singles
Songs written by Masafumi Gotoh
2010 songs
Ki/oon Music singles
Japanese film songs
Music based on films
Inio Asano